The 2000 United States Shadow Senator election in the District of Columbia took place on November 7, 2000, to elect a shadow member to the United States Senate to represent the District of Columbia. The member was only recognized by the District of Columbia and not officially sworn or seated by the United States Senate. Incumbent Shadow Senator Florence Pendleton won reelection to a third term with virtually no opposition.

Primary elections
Party primaries took place on September 12, 2000.

Democratic primary

Candidates
 Florence Pendleton, incumbent Shadow Senator

Campaign
Pendleton faced no opposition in the Democratic primary.

Results

General election
Janet Helms, the Republican nominee, withdrew prior to the election. Pendleton won with nearly 90% of the vote.

Candidates
 Florence Pendleton (Democratic)
 Janet Helms (Republican)

Results

References

United States Shadow Senator
2000